Funerals and Fly Fishing (2004) is a book by Mary Bartek.  It was a 2006 Mark Twain Award nominee and a 2006 Georgia Book Award Nominee.

Plot summary
In the beginning of this book, Brad Stanislawski (a bullied, tall, sixth grader) is happy that school is over. When he meets with his mother, he finds out that he must visit his grandfather (a man that he has never met) in Pennsylvania.

Reception
Kirkus Reviews refers to funerals and Fly Fishing as an "amusing, touching first-person narrative." and "...readers will see there’s a lot more to funerals and fly-fishing than meets the eye."

References

2004 American novels

Novels set in Pennsylvania